Sun Comes Up Again was the debut album by English indie rock band I Am Arrows, released in August 2010. The album was produced at Eastcote Studios in London, by Eliot James.

Track listing

The track listing was confirmed by I Am Arrows front man Andy Burrows in May 2010.

References

External links
I Am Arrows: Sun Comes Up Again (2010): Review at BBC.
I Am Arrows: Sun Comes Up Again (2010): Information at iTunes

2010 debut albums
Mercury Records albums